Detroit (a.k.a. The Band Detroit, so as not to be confused with the city of Detroit) was a spinoff of rock group The Detroit Wheels. This revised version of that band was formed by Mitch Ryder as a successor to The Wheels in 1970. The only original Wheel in the group was the drummer Johnny "Bee" Badanjek; other members were guitarists Steve Hunter and Brett Tuggle, organist Harry Phillips and bassists W.R. Cooke and John Sauter. A single album was released by this grouping, a 1971 self-titled LP issued on Paramount Records (US #176 in 1972). They had a hit with their version of the Lou Reed - penned song "Rock & Roll", which Reed liked enough to ask Steve Hunter to join his backing band. Ryder quit the group because of voice problems in 1972, and Detroit vocalist Rusty Day (formerly of the American Amboy Dukes and Cactus) took over his spot; without Ryder, the group floundered, and eventually broke up in 1974.

While not as commercially successful, Rusty Day's era of Detroit was a powerhouse to be reckoned with. He used to sing for Ted Nugent & The Amboy Dukes, and was soon to form Cactus. Rusty, having been the original singer, picked prior to Mitch's return from Memphis and being asked to sing with them due to Rusty's having other commitments. Rusty's time at the helm waited. When he returned the band was Re-energized, and managed by John Sinclair, and Pete Andrews. The band toured all over spreading the gospel of Detroit Rock n Roll. Day, backed with soon to be legendary guitar hero, Steve Gaines (who would later form his own band, Crawdad, and would eventually join Lynyrd Skynyrd); took the band in a different, but in a still solid rocking direction This lineup also featured Bill Hodgson on guitar (formerly of Shadowfax, soon to reform the band), Ted "T-Mel" Smith (formerly of the Spinners), Nathaniel Peterson (later to become of Leon Mills's band Brat Axis), and Terry Emery (later to be a member of Crawdad and eventually .38 Special). Some recordings exist out there of this era.

In 2005, Detroit re-emerged once again. original members W. Ron Cooke (Bass/Vocals) and Johnny 'Bee' Badanjek (Drums), got together to record a new album for Detroit Artist Workshop Group & Woodshed Productions. The duo brought in Steve Dansby (Guitar), a noted guitar sideman in the Motor City scene, having also played with Ron Cooke & Rusty Day in Day's 2nd incarnation of 'Cactus', as well as other side projects. As well as Micheal Katon, a noted Blues-Rock Pioneer, who had played with Dansby, Ron Cooke and Harry Philips in another band w Scott Morgan in the 1980s. This union began pounding out material in some of Detroit area's best Studios; Big Sky w Geoff Micheals, Rock City Studios w Pete Bankert (Destroy All Monsters), and Harmonie Park Studios w Brian & Mark Pastoria (Adrenalin/DC Drive).

In an effort to bridge the gap between the eras of Mitch Ryder & Rusty Day, as well as stay in tune with the later sounds of Detroit Rock & Roll; they enlisted the Vocals of Tom Ingham (Mugzy/Weapons/Plow/Romeo Rock & More). Tom's take on the Detroit sound filled out well with the rest of the band. The album, called Dead Man's Hand was released in 2006, and is still available. This independent release included special appearances by Scott Morgan, Johnny Spark, Johnny Arizona, J.B. Sweet and Chris Codish.

Albums

Detroit (1971) 
Track Listing

Side One
 "Long Neck Goose" - (Bob Ezrin, Mitch Ryder)
 "Is It You (Or Is It Me)" - (Johnny Badanjek, Mitch Ryder)
 "It Ain't Easy" - (Ron Davies)
 "Rock & Roll" - (Lou Reed)
Side Two
 "Let It Rock" - (Chuck Berry)
 "Drink" - (Jimmy Optner, Mark Manko)
 "Box of Old Roses" - (W. R. Cooke)
 "I Found a Love" - (Robert West, Willie Schofield, Wilson Pickett)

Personnel

 Mitch Ryder - lead vocals
 Steve Hunter - lead guitar
 Brett Tuggle - guitar
 Harry Phillips - keyboards
 W. R. Cooke - bass, backing vocals; lead vocals on "Box of Old Roses"
 Johnny Badanjek - drums, backing vocals; co-lead vocals on "Is It You (Or Is It Me)"
 "Dirty Ed" Okalski - congas, tambourine
Additional Musicians
 Boot Hill - keyboards, harmonica
 John Sauter - bass
 Mark Manko - second guitar on "Long Neck Goose", "It Ain't Easy", "Let It Rock" and "I Found A Love"

Singles
Paramount USA	PAA-0051   1970
A: "The Girl from the North Country"
B: "I Can't See Nobody"

Paramount USA	PAA-0133   1971
A: "Rock 'n Roll"
B: "Box of Old Roses"

Paramount USA	PAA-0158  1972
A: "Oo La La La Dee Da Doo"
B: "Gimme Shelter"

References

 [ Detroit] at Allmusic.com
 W.R. Cooke/Johnny Badanjek, Rusty Day. Micheal Valentino
 Detroit Artist Workshop Group
 www.detroitrocknroll.com

Musical groups from Detroit
Musical groups established in 1970
Musical groups disestablished in 1974
1970 establishments in Michigan
1974 disestablishments in Michigan